Historic counties  and territories in Quebec, Canada, followed by their respective county seats are listed below. The list is sorted in alphabetical order by county name, but can also be sorted in alphabetical order by seat.

In terms of internal divisions of counties, there are four types of counties:
 those that contain only townships, as is the case with those counties surveyed by the British after 1763;
 those that contain only parishes, as is the case with those counties chiefly in the Saint Lawrence Valley settled by French colonists prior to 1761;
 those that contain both townships and parishes, and
 those that contain townships and undivided lands, as is the case with the northern counties outside the main populated areas of the province.

Parishes as a land unit division arise from the elevation of municipalities based on religious parish limits (parish municipalities). Quebec's counties were dissolved in the early 1980s and Quebec was then divided into regional county municipalities.

Abitibi Territory
Mistassini Territory
Nouveau-Quebec Territory

Renamed counties

 Laval County – Former name of Ile-Jésus County.
 Jacques Cartier County – Renamed in 1970. Former name of Ile-de-Montréal County. It absorbed Hochelaga County in 1921.
 Ottawa County – Former name of Hull County.
 Wright County – Renamed to Gatineau County?

External links

Counties, List of Quebec
Quebec
Canada geography articles needing translation from French Wikipedia